Partecosta macleani is a species of sea snail, a marine gastropod mollusk in the family Terebridae, the auger snails.

Description

Distribution
This marine species occurs off the Eastern Cape, South Africa.

References

External links
 Bratcher T. (1988). Six new species of Terebridae (Mollusca: Gastropoda) from Panama and the Indo-West Pacific. The Veliger. 30(4): 412–416
 Fedosov, A. E.; Malcolm, G.; Terryn, Y.; Gorson, J.; Modica, M. V.; Holford, M.; Puillandre, N. (2020). Phylogenetic classification of the family Terebridae (Neogastropoda: Conoidea). Journal of Molluscan Studies.

Terebridae
Gastropods described in 1988